Sir Walter Watson Hughes (22 August 1803 – 1 January 1887), who before his knighthood was frequently referred to as "Captain Hughes", was a pastoralist, public benefactor and founder of the University of Adelaide, South Australia.

Early life
Hughes was born in Pittenweem, Fife, Scotland, the third son of Thomas Hughes and his wife Eliza, née Anderson. Hughes attended school in Crail and was apprenticed to a cooper for a short time - he then entered the merchant service and became a master, including whaling in the Arctic for several years. After hearing of opportunities for trade in Asia, Hughes purchased a brig, Hero, in Calcutta and traded opium in the Indian Ocean and seas of China, having to contend with pirates.

Australia
Hughes emigrated to South Australia in 1840, started business with Bunce & Thomson and took up land. Hughes suspected the land on which he kept sheep contained mineral deposits and informed his shepherds to look for minerals. In 1860 the Wallaroo copper-mine was discovered on his property, and in 1861 the even more important Moonta mine was discovered nearby. Hughes secured the largest interest in both mines and became wealthy, despite paying several thousand pounds to rival claimants. In 1873 he joined with Thomas Elder in bearing the expense of the exploring expedition under Colonel Peter Warburton. In 1872 Hughes offered £20,000 for the endowment of a theological college. It was, however, felt that so large a gift might be better used to found a university, and Hughes agreeing, the Adelaide University Association was established. The act of incorporation of the University of Adelaide was passed in 1874, but practically speaking the University did not begin to operate until three years later.

Late life

Hughes and his wife subsequently returned to England, and bought the Fancourt estate in Chertsey, Surrey.

Hughes was knighted in 1880. Around this time he formed a partnership with P. B. Burgoyne, who was building up a market for fine Australian wines (notably Tintara) in London, and was in dire need of capital.

He died at his home on 1 January 1887 after a long illness.

Legacy 
He has been frequently referred to as the "father" of the University of Adelaide. The report of the council of the university for the year 1887, in recording their regret at his death, called him "the Founder of the Chair of Classics and of the Chair of English Language and Literature, and Mental and Moral Philosophy--whose munificence led to the establishment of the University".

The coastal town of Port Hughes was named in his honour.

Family
On 22 September 1841 Hughes married Sophia Richman ( – June 1885), eldest daughter of John Henry Richman, who arrived in South Australia with his family aboard Thomas Harrison in February 1839. They had no children together. He began a relationship with an Aboriginal woman (Mary Jane Narungga) who give birth to Walter Hughes' son John Sansbury in 1854.

Hughes was an uncle of Sir John James Duncan, and an ancestor of Adam Goodes.

References

External links
Picture of Sir Walter Watson Hughes statue at University of Adelaide

External links

1803 births
1887 deaths
Settlers of South Australia
Knights Bachelor
Scottish emigrants to colonial Australia
Adelaide Club
19th-century Australian philanthropists
People from Pittenweem